Ananepa is a monotypic moth genus of the family Noctuidae erected by George Hampson in 1926. Its only species, Ananepa doda, was first described by Swinhoe in 1902. It is found in Taiwan.

References

Catocalinae
Noctuoidea genera
Monotypic moth genera